Faraz Jaka (born September 9, 1985, in San Jose, California) is an American professional poker player and businessman who was World Poker Tour (WPT) Player of the Year for Season VIII (2009–2010). He has reached two WPT final tables, six WSOP final tables and his lifetime tournament winnings exceed $10 million. Jaka is also behind Checkraise, a new poker site to be launched in the Brazilian market in 2017.

Early life 

Jaka is from San Jose, California and is of Pakistani descent. He attended Piedmont Hills High School, and during this time, Jaka ran track, breaking 2:00 in the half mile and 4:30 in the mile. He also played for the basketball team, wrote poetry and became an avid hip-hop fan. Jaka often says it was during this time that he developed the competitive spirit and mental fortitude that would help him in his poker career.

Poker

Early career
Jaka began his poker career playing online and in small live games during his freshman year at the University of Illinois at Urbana–Champaign.  Early on, with little knowledge of the game, Jaka had a habit of playing any two suited hole cards with the intent to draw to a flush.  His frequent use of this play quickly earned him the nickname "The Toilet".  Jaka embraced the tag, adopting it as his online alias, and the moniker has stuck ever since.

Jaka found early success in high-stake online cash games, soon building his bankroll to more than $170,000 during his sophomore year in college.  But as he began playing beyond his means, he was challenging the odds, and probability caught up with him.

After some soul searching, Jaka bounced back, switching up his approach and opting to play low buy-in tournaments and sit-and-gos rather than cash games.  Today, Jaka credits his decision to focus on studying tournament strategy as essential to his success.

World Poker Tour 
Jaka has twelve cashes at the World Poker Tour (WPT) which includes four final tables, the first was at the WPT Bellagio Cup V finishing runner-up to Alexandre Gomes and earning $774,780, other final table professionals included: Justin Smith (3rd), Alec Torelli (4th) and Erik Seidel (6th). Jaka then made another final table in the same season at the WPT Doyle Brunson Five Diamond World Poker Classic he finishing in third for $571,374, behind the winner Daniel Alaei and runner-up Josh Arieh also at the final table were Shawn Buchanan(4th) and Scotty Nguyen (5th). He also made a deep run in the $25,000 WPT Championship event where he finished in 14th place earning $51,736.

World Series of Poker 
At the World Series of Poker, Jaka has thirty-nine cashes, including six final tables, one where he finished in third place behind the winner Matt Hawrilenko and runner-up Josh Brikis at the 2008 World Series of Poker in the $5,000 No Limit Hold'em – Six Handed event and received $400,525. Later at the 2010 World Series of Poker, he made it to the quarterfinal round of 256 entries in the $10,000 Heads-Up No-Limit Hold'em Championship earning $92,580. In 2017, Jaka made other two final tables ($10,000 No-Limit Hold'em Championship and the $2,620 No-Limit Hold'em The Marathon), cashing a total of five events this summer, which totaled over $272,000 in winnings.

Other poker events 
Jaka won the $1,000 No Limit Hold'em event at the 2008 L.A. Poker Classic, earning $104,900 the event was held at the Commerce Casino in Los Angeles. At the North American Poker Tour (NAPT) in 2010 in the $25,000 Invitational High Roller Bounty Shootout, Jaka came in fifth winning $95,000 which includes the bounties that were won. In 2012 at the Pokerstars Caribbean Adventure, he finished third for $755,000. He led the tournament on day 2 and at the beginning of the final table.

As of 2017, his total live tournament winnings exceed $5,500,000.

Entrepreneurship 
Faraz Jaka received bachelor degrees in economics and business from the University of Illinois at Urbana–Champaign and has often been quoted as saying he considers himself "a businessman first and a poker player second." As he has experienced increased success in the poker world, Jaka has made good on this statement, investing his earnings in real estate and startups.

In 2018, Faraz Jaka launched an online poker website, CheckRaise, a real money gaming site, only for Brazilians. He declared in an interview that he works over 50 hours per week on this project, and then spends less time playing poker.

References

External links 
 Tournament Trail Q and A -- Faraz Jaka
 ESPN – 2010 Players to Watch
 Faraz Jaka – Poker Player Profile

American poker players
American people of Pakistani descent
1985 births
Living people
People from San Jose, California